Carlos Emilio Carmona Tello (born 21 February 1987) is a Chilean former professional footballer who played as a midfielder.

Club career
Carmona started his career as a centre midfielder in Coquimbo Unido. Two years later he moved to O'Higgins.

On 1 June 2008, Carmona was bought by Serie A side Reggina. He made his debut abroad on 14 September, starting and playing the full 90 minutes in a 1–1 draw against Torino. Carmona appeared in 32 matches during the campaign, which ended in relegation.

In the 2010 summer Carmona moved to Atalanta, also relegated to Serie B. He had 32 appearances as La Dea returned to the top level.

Carmona signed with Major League Soccer side Atlanta United on 6 February 2017. On 7 March 2017 he made his debut, receiving a red card in the 88th minute in a 1–2 loss to the New York Red Bulls. On 7 May 2017 he scored his first goal for the team in the 39th minute in a 1–3 loss to New York City FC.

In January 2018, Carmona was transferred to Chilean side Colo-Colo. After ending his contract, in February 2021, he joined his hometown team, Coquimbo Unido, at the Primera B.

In January 2022, he announced his retirement after winning the 2021 Primera B along with Coquimbo Unido.

International career

Youth
Carmona was Chile's youngest player at the 2005 FIFA World Youth Championship in the Netherlands where he showed some glimpse of talent in Chile's opening game, a 7–0 win against Honduras. Two years later, he captained Chile to the 2007 FIFA U-20 World Cup where he played in a 3–0 win against Canada, a 3–0 win against Congo, a 4–0 win against Nigeria and a 1–0 win against Austria; Chile eventually were bronze medalists at the end of tournament.

His international fortunes continued as Chile's coach Marcelo Bielsa called him up for the 2008 Toulon Tournament, an Under-23 football event, where Carmona won a silver medal with his side.

Senior
On 19 November 2008, Carmona made his debut for the senior team in a 0–3 loss to Spain.

On 6 February 2013, against Egypt, Carmona scored his first goal for the national team in a 2–1 victory for the Chilean team.

Carmona was named in the 2015 Copa America squad but had to withdraw through injury and was replaced by José Pedro Fuenzalida.

International goals
Scores and results list Chile's goal tally first.

Honours

Club
Atalanta
 Serie B: 2010–11

Colo Colo
 Supercopa de Chile: 2018
 Copa Chile: 2019

Coquimbo Unido
 Primera B: 2021

International
Chile
 China Cup: 2017

References

External links

1987 births
Living people
People from Coquimbo
Chilean footballers
Chilean expatriate footballers
Chile international footballers
Chile under-20 international footballers
Coquimbo Unido footballers
O'Higgins F.C. footballers
Reggina 1914 players
Atalanta B.C. players
Atlanta United FC players
Colo-Colo footballers
Chilean Primera División players
Serie A players
Serie B players
Major League Soccer players
Primera B de Chile players
Expatriate footballers in Italy
Chilean expatriate sportspeople in Italy
Expatriate soccer players in the United States
Chilean expatriate sportspeople in the United States
2010 FIFA World Cup players
2011 Copa América players
2014 FIFA World Cup players
Association football midfielders